Eadgar or Edgar is an Anglo-Saxon given name and can refer to the following individuals:

 Edgar of England, ( – 975), King of England
 Eadgar of Hereford, (died ), Bishop of Hereford
 Edgar of Lindsey, (died between 716 and 731), Bishop of Lindsey
 Eadgar of London (died between 789 and 793), Bishop of London
 Edgar Ætheling ( – 1125 or after), claimant to the English throne in 1066
 Edgar of Scotland (–1107), King of Scotland
 William the Trouvère, Anglo-Norman poet; born Adgar or Aedgar

See also
 Edgar (disambiguation)